Ishq Click is a 2016 Indian Hindi-language romantic film, directed by Anil Balani and produced by Ajay Jaiswal and Satish Tripathi. It stars Adhyayan Suman and Sara Loren. The film is based on the life of a supermodel from Darjeeling who struggles very hard to become a top model and a photographer who helps her in her struggle.

Plot 
From Darjeeling , a girl; Sophie Dias (Sara Loren), struggles too hard to become a top Super Model and during her struggle she meets a photographer; Aditya Vardhan (Adhyayan Suman), who helps her throughout her efforts and also falls in love with her. The movie was released on 22 July 2016 and the Promotions of the movie is done by Vedant Kumar Mishra Shamrock Communications.

Cast

 Adhyayan Suman as Aditya Vardhan (Protagonist Lead)
 Sara Loren as Sophie Dias Vardhan (Protagonist Lead)
Sanjay Gurbaxani as Indra Sengupta
Keshav Arora as Dr. Tushar
Sanskkriti Jain as Era Sengupta
Raj Premi as Inspector Kadam
Manas Srivastava as Advocate Manchandani
Anjali Rana as Advocate Smita
Sarita Patil as Nun
Trilok Bhatia as Priest
Yash Jaiswal

Soundtrack

The soundtrack singers included Ankit Tiwari, Mohammed Irfan, Nakash Aziz, Neeti Mohan, Amanat Ali Khan, Shalmali Kholgade, Hricha Narayan, Anamika Singh and Ajay Jaiswal.

References

External links
 
 

2016 films
2010s Hindi-language films